Clinopodium vulgare, the wild basil, is a species of flowering plant in the family Lamiaceae.

Description
Wild basil is a perennial rhizomatous herb with square, upright, hairy stems and opposite pairs of leaves. The leaves are hairy, ovate or lanceolate in shape, and have short or no stalks, wedge-shaped bases and bluntly-toothed margins. The inflorescence is a terminal spike consisting of several loose whorls of clusters of flowers growing in the axils of the leaves. The flowers are pink, violet or purple and have two lips. Each has four stamens, a long style and fused carpels.

Distribution
Wild basil occurs in suitable locations in most of Europe, western and central Asia, North America and North Africa. Its typical habitat is dry grassland and heathland, usually on limestone or chalky soils. Though its distribution is patchy it is widespread and not threatened in the UK.

Uses
The leaves of wild basil are used as an aromatic herb in the preparation of food dishes and to make a herbal tea. They can also be used in the preparation of both a brown and a yellow dye.

This plant has traditionally been used as an astringent, a cardiac stimulant, an expectorant, to reduce flatulence and to increase perspiration. It has been used traditionally in Bulgaria for the healing of wounds and has been shown to have anti-bacterial properties.

Ecology
Pollination is by bees and Lepidoptera.

References

vulgare
Plants described in 1753
Taxa named by Carl Linnaeus